Cadi-Keuy FC is a defunct sports club of Istanbul, Ottoman Empire.

History
Cadi-Keuy FC was a club which was founded by Englishmen James Lafontaine and Horace Armitage in 1902. Its name is a foreign rendering of Kadıköy, its home ground, as the standard Turkish Latin alphabet did not yet exist at the time of the club's creation.

Honours
Istanbul Football League:
Winners: 1905–1906, 1906–1907

Matches

Cadi-Keuy FC-Moda FC:0–5 (1906)
Cadi-Keuy FC-Galatasaray SK:11–0 (1906)
Cadi-Keuy FC-Galatasaray SK:7–0 (1906)
Cadi-Keuy FC-Galatasaray SK:6–4 (1906)
Cadi-Keuy FC-Galatasaray SK:2–1 (1906)
Cadi-Keuy FC-Galatasaray SK:0–0 (1906)
Cadi-Keuy FC-Galatasaray SK:11–0 (1907)
Cadi-Keuy FC-Galatasaray SK:8–0 (1907)
Cadi-Keuy FC-Galatasaray SK:0–0 (1907)
Galatasaray SK-Cadi-Keuy FC:4–0 (1909)
Galatasaray SK-Cadi-Keuy FC:3–0 awd. (1910)
Galatasaray SK-Cadi-Keuy FC:3–0 awd. (1911)
Cadi-Keuy FC-Galatasaray:0–0 (1912)
Fenerbahçe SK-Cadi-Keuy FC:0–2 (1908)
Fenerbahçe SK-Cadi-Keuy FC:2–1 (1909)
Fenerbahçe SK-Cadi-Keuy FC:2–3 (1909)
Fenerbahçe SK-Cadi-Keuy FC:1–3 (7 November 1909)
Fenerbahçe SK-Cadi-Keuy FC:2–0 (1910)
Fenerbahçe SK-Cadi-Keuy FC:1–3 (1910)
Fenerbahçe SK-Cadi-Keuy FC:4–1 (1911)
Fenerbahçe SK-Cadi-Keuy FC:3–2 (1911)
Fenerbahçe SK-Cadi-Keuy FC:3–1 (1911)
Fenerbahçe SK-Cadi-Keuy FC:4–0 (1912)
Fenerbahçe SK-Cadi-Keuy FC:4–1 (1912)

League tables

Istanbul League

1904–05 Istanbul Football League: 1) HMS Imogene FC 2) Moda FC 3) Cadi-Keuy FC 4) Elpis FC
1905–06 Istanbul Football League: 1) Cadi-Keuy FC 2) HMS Imogene FC 3) Moda FC 4) Elpis FC

1906–07 Istanbul Football League: 1) Cadi-Keuy FC 2) Moda FC 3) HMS Imogene FC 4) Galatasaray SK 5) Elpis FC
1907–08 Istanbul Football League: 1) Moda FC 2) Cadi-Keuy FC 3) Galatasaray SK 4) Elpis FC 5) HMS Imogene FC

1908–09 Istanbul Football League: 1) Galatasaray SK 2) Moda FC 3) HMS Imogene FC 4) Cadi-Keuy FC
1909–10 Istanbul Football League: 1) Galatasaray SK 2) Strugglers FC 3) Moda FC 4) Cadi-Keuy FC 5) Fenerbahçe SK

1910–11 Istanbul Football League: 1) Galatasaray SK 2) Progress FC 3) Cadi-Keuy FC 4) Strugglers FC
1911–12 Istanbul Football League: 1) Fenerbahçe SK 2) Rumblers FC 3) Strugglers FC 4)Progress FC 5)Cadi-Keuy FC

See also
List of Turkish Sports Clubs by Foundation Dates

References

 Fenerbahçe Spor Kulübü Tarihi 1907–1957 (by Dr. Rüştü Dağlaroğlu) The History of Fenerbahçe SK 1907–1957.
 Kadıköy Futbol Kulübü. Türk Futbol Tarihi. vol.1. page (22). (June 1992) Türkiye Futbol Federasyonu Yayınları.

Defunct football clubs in Turkey
Association football clubs disestablished in 1912
Sport in Kadıköy
1912 disestablishments in the Ottoman Empire
Association football clubs established in 1902
1902 establishments in the Ottoman Empire